This is the discography of American hip hop musician Chuck Inglish.

Albums

Studio albums

Collaborative albums

Extended plays

Mixtapes

Singles

As featured artist

References

Discographies of American artists
Hip hop discographies